The 1954–55 Serie A season was won by Milan.

Teams
Catania and Pro Patria had been promoted from Serie B.

In February 13, 1955 Inter, Juventus, Roma and Milan all lost in the same matchday the last time until September 18, 2022.

Final classification

Milan also joined the 1955 Latin Cup.

Results

Top goalscorers

References and sources
Almanacco Illustrato del Calcio - La Storia 1898-2004, Panini Edizioni, Modena, September 2005

External links
  - All results on RSSSF Website.

Serie A seasons
Italy
1954–55 in Italian football leagues